Mark Singer is an American doctor who is best known for inventing, with speech pathologist Eric Blom,  while working at Methodist Hospital, Indianapolis, a type of voice prosthesis that allows victims of laryngeal cancer (cancer of the larynx) to talk.

References

American oncologists
Living people
Year of birth missing (living people)
Place of birth missing (living people)